R v Evans and McDonald was the prosecution of two footballers, Ched Evans and Clayton McDonald, who were accused of the rape of a woman. On 20 April 2012, Evans was convicted and sentenced to five years imprisonment. McDonald was acquitted. Several people were later fined after naming the woman on Twitter and other social media websites.

Evans served  years in prison, being paroled on the Early Release Scheme. After this, his conviction was overturned on appeal in favour of a retrial. The appeal became a reported case by at least three sets of Law Reports as it confirmed only similar non-hearsay testimony of historic sexual encounters by a third party with a complainant, which is so similar that similarity cannot be reasonably explained by coincidence, can be admitted by the presiding judge, heard or written (adduced) in evidence and then considered by a jury. Such witnesses came forward who testified, with supporting evidence, to that effect. At retrial the jury found Evans not guilty, as McDonald had been found at the original trial.

Background
On 30 May 2011, Wales international and Sheffield United player Ched Evans and McDonald were arrested on suspicion of the sexual assault of a woman in Rhyl, Denbighshire, in connection with what was later proven and admitted to have been sexual intercourse at a Premier Inn in Rhuddlan on the same day. On 26 July, the two were charged with rape, which they both denied.

Criminal proceedings

Preliminary hearings
On 8 August 2011, McDonald and Evans appeared before Prestatyn Magistrates' Court charged with rape. The defendants were released on bail and did not comment on the matter, but McDonald told his team, Port Vale F.C.'s website that he "strongly refute[d]" the allegation. Evans also issued a statement on Sheffield United's website stating that he "strenuously denie[d] the charge". McDonald and Evans entered pleas of not guilty at the Crown Court at Caernarfon on 14 October, and were remanded on bail.

Trial
The trial took place at that court in April 2012. The woman, a 19-year-old waitress, said she had drunk two glasses of wine, four double vodkas with lemonade, and a shot of sambuca. As a result, she told police she "felt tipsy but not out of control". However, she woke up naked and confused in a hotel bed with no memory of anything since leaving a dancing session with friends the previous night. She suspected that her memory loss was due to a spiked drink. Samples taken the next day showed no alcohol, although the prosecution argued this was due to normal elimination over time. The samples did show traces of cocaine and cannabis, which she denied taking on the night of the incident. The prosecution argument was that the woman was too intoxicated to have consented.

The defence agreed that McDonald met the woman on the street and took her back to the hotel, where they were later joined by Evans. However, they claimed that both men had sex with the woman separately and with her consent. They argued she was not too drunk to consent, and suggested that her claim of memory loss may be a lie.

On 20 April 2012, the jury returned its verdicts. McDonald was acquitted. Evans was convicted of rape and sentenced to five years imprisonment.  Judge Merfyn Hughes QC stated in his sentencing remarks that: "The complainant was 19 years of age and was extremely intoxicated. CCTV footage shows, in my view, the extent of her intoxication when she stumbled into your friend. As the jury have found, she was in no condition to have sexual intercourse. When you arrived at the hotel, you must have realised that."

Appeals
On 24 April 2012, it was announced that Evans was seeking the leave of the Court of Appeal to appeal against his conviction. On 20 August 2012, leave to appeal was refused by a single judge of the Court of Appeal, and on 6 November 2012, a three-judge panel agreed with the refusal.

By November 2013, Evans had recruited a new legal team headed by an ex-senior detective, Russ Whitfield, and higher courts specialist Criminal lawyer David Emanuel. In July 2014, he launched another appeal attempt via the Criminal Cases Review Commission.

Evans was released from prison, reaching the date for release on the early release scheme, without misbehaviour nor an adverse Probation Service report, on 17 October 2014.

Shortly afterwards, the Criminal Cases Review Commission announced that they were prioritising their review of his conviction. In October 2015, the CCRC, based on new material which was not considered by the jury at trial, decided to refer the case to the Court of Appeal.  This obliged the court to reconsider the trial process and evidence admitted and excluded leading to the conviction.

The appeal evidence was heard by Lord Justice Hallett, Mr Justice Flaux, and Sir David Maddison on 22 and 23 March 2016, and the decision pronounced on 21 April. Evans's conviction was quashed, and the court ordered a retrial. To avoid prejudicing the retrial, it prohibited the publication of details of the appeal until the retrial was complete.

The Court of Criminal Appeal judgement stated:

According to The Guardian,

Retrial
Evans' retrial began on 4 October 2016 at Cardiff Crown Court. The main new evidence included was from other men who had had consensual sex with the woman, who testified that her sexual behaviour was similar to that which Evans described. Details of a complainant's sexual history are not usually admissible, but there is an exception, reiterated (upheld) on appeal in the Law Reports, for evidence which is "so similar [to the defence's account] that the similarity cannot reasonably be explained as a coincidence". The prosecution's allegations of the witnesses of perhaps receiving this account from Evans' defence campaign, and being motivated by the £50,000 reward offered for information were rejected by the jury.

On 14 October, following two hours of deliberation, the jury of seven women and five men returned a verdict of not guilty.

Naming of complainant on the internet
North Wales Police investigated claims that the woman had been named and subjected to abuse on Twitter after the trial. Former Lord Chancellor, Lord Falconer of Thoroton, Holly Dustin, the director of End Violence Against Women, and Secretary of State for the Home Department Theresa May warned of the risks posed by discussing court cases on social media websites, and reiterated the need to protect the anonymity of complainants in cases concerning sexual offences. As of 6 October 2012, North Wales Police had arrested 23 people on suspicion of offences relating to the naming of the complainant. Police also investigated a mistake by Sky News which showed the name of the complainant on television.

Sheffield United academy and reserve team player Connor Brown was suspended by his club after allegedly making offensive comments about the woman on Twitter, although he did not give her name.

On 5 November 2012, nine people who had named the complainant on Twitter and Facebook, including a cousin of Evans, were each told to pay her £624 after admitting the offence at Prestatyn magistrates' court.  A tenth person pleaded not guilty, but later changed her plea to guilty on 21 January 2013.

The complainant changed her identity as a result of having been named on social media; in October 2014, after Evans' release from prison, it was reported that her new identity had been illegally revealed on Twitter and blogs.

The complainant continued to be identified online during Evans' retrial in 2016.

References

External links
Twitter is not a law-free area, says Dominic Grieve The Daily Telegraph, 11 May 2012.
Police speak to Sky News over Ched Evans rape tweet Press Gazette, 18 May 2012.

2012 in Wales
2016 in Wales
Rape in Wales
Trials in Wales
2012 in case law
2016 in case law
2012 in British law
2016 in British law
Criminal trials that ended in acquittal
E
Overturned convictions in the United Kingdom
Sex crime trials